Leonore Alderstein "Lee" Herzenberg (born February 15, 1935) is an American immunologist, geneticist and professor at Stanford University. Born in New York City, U.S.A., she never received a college degree but studied biology and worked as a researcher alongside her husband Leonard ("Len") since he began his doctorate at the California Institute of Technology (Caltech) in 1952. At the time, Caltech did not accept women, but although she was registered at Pomona College nearby, Lee was allowed to audit courses and take tests at Caltech.

In 1981, the University of Paris gave Lee the title of Doctor of Science. She and Len ran the Herzenberg Laboratory together and Len always supported her role as a leader in science.

Lee and Len Herzenberg had four children: Jana Herzen, formerly Janet Herzenberg, is a singer-songwriter and the founder of Motéma Music; Berri H. Michel owns a bicycle shop in Santa Cruz, California; Rick; and Michael.

References

External links
 "A Conversation with Leonard and Leonore Herzenberg" 
 "Leonore A. Herzenberg: An Oral History," Stanford Historical Society Oral History Program, 2014.

1935 births
Living people
American geneticists
American immunologists
California Institute of Technology alumni
Scientists from New York City
Pomona College alumni
Stanford University faculty